Isorrhoa aetheria is a moth in the family Cosmopterigidae. It was described by Edward Meyrick in 1897. It is found in Australia.

References

Cosmopteriginae
Moths described in 1897